Michael Ward (born 6 January 1968) is an English literary critic and theologian. His academic focus is theological imagination, especially in the writings of C.S. Lewis, J.R.R. Tolkien, and G.K. Chesterton.  He is best known for his book Planet Narnia, in which he argues that C.S. Lewis structured The Chronicles of Narnia so as to embody and express the imagery of the seven heavens. On the fiftieth anniversary of Lewis's death, Ward unveiled a permanent national memorial to him in Poets' Corner, Westminster Abbey.

Ward was born in Cuckfield, West Sussex. He studied at Regent's Park College, Oxford, Peterhouse, Cambridge, and the University of St Andrews. He is currently an Associate Member of the Faculty of Theology and Religion at the University of Oxford, and Professor of Apologetics at Houston Christian University. He was Senior Research Fellow at Blackfriars Hall, University of Oxford (2012-2021).

Ward trained for the Anglican ministry at Ridley Hall, Cambridge, and was ordained a priest in the Church of England in 2005. He served as Chaplain of Peterhouse, Cambridge (2004-2007) and Chaplain of St Peter's College, Oxford (2009-2012). He joined the Catholic Church in 2012, and was ordained a priest within the Personal Ordinariate of Our Lady of Walsingham in June 2018.

Ward played the part of C.S. Lewis's vicar in The Most Reluctant Convert. He has been an extra in a number of films and television dramas, including a speaking role in A Very Open Prison and a featured cameo in The World Is Not Enough.

Bibliography

Books
 After Humanity: A Guide to C.S. Lewis's The Abolition of Man, Word on Fire Academic, 2021. 
 C.S. Lewis at Poets' Corner (edited with Peter S. Williams), Wipf & Stock, 2016. 
 The Cambridge Companion to C.S. Lewis (edited with Robert MacSwain), Cambridge University Press, 2010. 
 Planet Narnia: The Seven Heavens in the Imagination of C.S. Lewis, Oxford University Press, 2008. 
 Heresies and How to Avoid Them: Why it Matters What Christians Believe (edited with Ben Quash), Hendrickson, 2007.

Essays
 "An Experiment in Charity: C.S. Lewis on Love in the Literary Arts" in The Inklings and Culture (ed. Monika B. Hilder et al), Cambridge Scholars Publishing, 2020. 
 "Afterword: A Brief History of the Oxford C.S. Lewis Society" in C.S. Lewis and His Circle: Essays and Memoirs from the Oxford C.S. Lewis Society (ed. Roger White, Judith Wolfe, and Brendan N. Wolfe), Oxford University Press, 2015. 
 "The Tragedy is in the Pity: C.S. Lewis and the Song of the Goat" in Christian Theology and Tragedy (eds. T. Kevin Taylor and Giles Waller), Ashgate, 2012. 
 "The Good Serves the Better and Both the Best: C.S. Lewis on Imagination and Reason in Apologetics" in Imaginative Apologetics: Theology, Philosophy and the Catholic Tradition (ed. Andrew Davison), SCM Press, 2011. 
 "C.S. Lewis" in The Heart of Faith: Following Christ in the Church of England (ed. Andrew Atherstone), Lutterworth, 2008. 
 "Christianity and Film" in Christ and Culture in Dialogue (ed. Angus Menuge), Concordia Academic Press, 1999.

References

External links
 Official website of Michael Ward

1968 births
Living people
People from Cuckfield
Alumni of Regent's Park College, Oxford
Alumni of Peterhouse, Cambridge
Alumni of Ridley Hall, Cambridge
Alumni of the University of St Andrews
Fellows of Blackfriars, Oxford
Houston Christian University faculty
21st-century English Anglican priests
Anglican priest converts to Roman Catholicism